KLQP is a 25,000 watt commercial FM radio station which operates on 92.1 mhz with an antenna 91 meters height above average terrain from Madison, Minnesota. The station was put on the air on January 31, 1983 by Maynard Meyer and Terry Overlander who formed Lac Qui Parle Broadcasting Co., Inc. In 2020 Meyer became sole owner when he purchased Overlander’s shares of stock.  KLQP, also known as "Q-92" serves a 5-county area in western Minnesota and part of eastern South Dakota.

External links
Official site
 

Radio stations in Minnesota
Radio stations established in 1983